César Javier Vega Perrone (born 2 September 1959) is a retired Uruguayan football defender and current manager. Vega received a total of eight international caps (no goals) for the Uruguay national football team. He represented his native country at the 1986 FIFA World Cup, wearing the number 13 jersey. He is currently the manager of Mons Calpe in the Gibraltar National League.

Vega played professional club football for Danubio, Progreso and Central Español in Uruguay, he also played for Atlante in Mexico and Textil Mandiyú in Argentina.

He was named as the head coach of Indios de Ciudad Juárez in Mexico's Liga de Ascenso in July 2011.

References

External links
 

1959 births
Living people
Uruguayan footballers
Association football defenders
Uruguay international footballers
1986 FIFA World Cup players
Footballers from Montevideo
Uruguayan Primera División players
Danubio F.C. players
C.A. Progreso players
Deportivo Mandiyú footballers
Central Español players
Atlante F.C. footballers
Uruguayan expatriate footballers
Expatriate footballers in Argentina
Expatriate footballers in Mexico
Mons Calpe S.C. managers
Gibraltar National League managers
Uruguayan football managers
Uruguayan expatriate football managers